Leirvíkar Ítróttarfelag, commonly known as LÍF or LÍF Leirvík, was a Faroese football club based in Leirvík. The club was founded in 1928. They merged with GÍ Gøta in 2008 to form Víkingur, in the year of team's 80th anniversary.

From 1982 to 1989, and for one final time in 1993, LÍF played in the country's top division, with the best finish being 4th place in 1984 and 1985. In 1986, they lost their only ever Faroe Islands Cup final by 2-1 to NSÍ Runavík.

Honours
1. deild: 2 (1981, 1992)
2. deild: 1 (1980)
Faroe Islands Cup: Runners-up (1986)

External links
Official website

Defunct football clubs in the Faroe Islands
Association football clubs established in 1928
Association football clubs disestablished in 2008
1928 establishments in the Faroe Islands
2008 disestablishments in the Faroe Islands

fo:LÍF